Chaf and Chamkhaleh (also known as Chamkhāleh and Cham Qal‘eh) is a city in the Central District of Langarud County, in Gilan Province of northwestern Iran.

The city is located on the Caspian Sea.

At the 2006 census, its population was 1,814, in 510 families.

It was formed by the 2006 merger of the cities of Chaf and Chamkhaleh.

Gallery

References

Cities in Gilan Province
Populated places in Langarud County
Populated coastal places in Iran
Populated places on the Caspian Sea
Port cities and towns in Iran
Populated places established in 2006
2006 establishments in Iran